The 1836 State of the Union Address was given by Andrew Jackson, the seventh president of the United States, on December 5, 1836.  He did not personally deliver the address to the 24th United States Congress, but a clerk did.  He concluded it with, "All that has occurred during my Administration is calculated to inspire me with increased confidence in the stability of our institutions; and should I be spared to enter upon that retirement which is so suitable to my age and infirm health and so much desired by me in other respects, I shall not cease to invoke that beneficent Being to whose providence we are already so signally indebted for the continuance of His blessings on our beloved country."

References

State of the Union addresses
Presidency of Andrew Jackson
State of the Union Address
State of the Union Address
State of the Union Address
State of the Union Address
24th United States Congress
December 1836 events
State of the Union